"Bussin" is a song by rappers Nicki Minaj and Lil Baby. It was written by Minaj, Lil Baby, Cyrick Palmer, Joshua Goods, Rahsul Barnes Greer, Terrell Greenlee, and produced by Swaggyono and DJ Tizz. It is their second collaboration, being released on February 11, 2022, one week after their own "Do We Have a Problem?". It was included on Minaj's first greatest hits album Queen Radio: Volume 1 (2022).

Background
On February 4, 2022, Minaj and Lil Baby released their first collaboration titled "Do We Have a Problem?". The music video of the song ends with a preview of "Bussin", which garnered positive reactions from fans. Minaj announced the song on her Twitter, saying "Next week we pushin B for Bussin btch WTF IS GOOD". The artwork was then revealed on February 7. The song is intended to appear on Minaj's upcoming album. The song is also part of a weekly surprise treat for the fans, referred to by Minaj as "Pink Friday".

Composition
The song sees Minaj and Baby trading verses over a "staccato, foreboding production", with the former "laying down a quick rap flow".

Commercial performance
In the United States, "Bussin" debuted and peaked at number 20 on the Billboard Hot 100 for the week ending February 26, 2022. It additionally charted on the Digital Song Sales chart at number five.

Charts

Release history

References

2022 singles
2022 songs
Lil Baby songs
Nicki Minaj songs
Republic Records singles
Songs written by Lil Baby
Songs written by Nicki Minaj